Libertyville is an unincorporated community in Vermillion and Vigo counties, in the U.S. state of Indiana. The county is in the Terre Haute Metropolitan Statistical Area.

History
A post office was established at Libertyville in 1871, and remained in operation until it was discontinued in 1904.

Geography

References

Unincorporated communities in Vermillion County, Indiana
Unincorporated communities in Vigo County, Indiana
Unincorporated communities in Indiana
Terre Haute metropolitan area